George Pfeifer (born 1955) is an American college basketball coach, whose last assignment was as an assistant coach at Montana State University in Bozeman.

He is a former head coach at three different college programs: Lewis–Clark State in Lewiston, Idaho, the University of Idaho in Moscow, and Montana State - Billings.

After serving as head coach for sixteen seasons at LCSC, his alma mater, Pfeifer left the NAIA college to become an assistant in the WAC at Idaho under Leonard Perry for the  season.

A few months later, Pfeifer was hired as the head coach at Montana State–Billings in the Great Northwest Athletic Conference. After three seasons at the Division II school, his contract was not renewed in 2011 and he became an assistant coach in the Big Sky Conference under Brad Huse at Montana State in Bozeman.

In 2013, Pfiefer started working in basketball operations under head coach Mark Few at Gonzaga University in Spokane.

In 2014, Pfeifer became the head coach at Lewis and Clark High School in Spokane.

Pfeifer received his bachelor's degree in social science from Lewis-Clark State in 1979 and later earned a master's degree in educational administration from the University of Idaho. His first job in 1979 was as a teacher and girls' basketball coach at St. Maries High School, his

College head coaching record

References

External links
 Montana State Bobcats - basketball - George Pfeifer - assistant coach
 MSU Billings - sports - basketball - head coach - George Pfeifer

1955 births
Living people
College men's basketball head coaches in the United States
High school basketball coaches in the United States
Idaho Vandals men's basketball coaches
Lewis–Clark State College alumni
Rocky Mountain College
Utah State Aggies men's basketball coaches
Place of birth missing (living people)